Pradeep Yadav is an Indian politician. His home town is Godda, Jharkhand and he is from Bohra village in Poreyahat block of Godda district. He is a current member of Jharkhand Legislative Assembly. He was elected to the 13th Lok Sabha, lower house of the Parliament of India from Godda, Jharkhand as a member of the Bharatiya Janata Party in a by-election.

He is a current Member of Legislative assembly of Jharkhand. He has been minister in the state cabinet twice. He was minister of Rural Development under the then chief minister Babulal Marandi. The second time he was a minister under Arjun Munda and the ministry was Human resource development. He started his political life as a student leader and was member of Bharatiya Janata Party. In 2007 he left Bharatiya Janata Party to join Jharkhand Vikas Morcha (Prajatantrik).

Babulal Marandi expelled his party MLAs Yadav and Bandhu Tirkey from the party for anti-party activities. Both of them later joined Indian National Congress in its Delhi headquarters as Jharkhand Vikas Morcha (Prajatantrik) party was merged with Bharatiya Janata Party.

References

External links
Official biographical sketch in Parliament of India website

1966 births
Living people
Jharkhand politicians
Bharatiya Janata Party politicians from Jharkhand
India MPs 1999–2004
Lok Sabha members from Jharkhand
Bihar MLAs 2000–2005
Indian National Congress politicians from Jharkhand
Jharkhand Vikas Morcha (Prajatantrik) politicians
Jharkhand MLAs 2000–2005
Jharkhand MLAs 2005–2009
Jharkhand MLAs 2009–2014
Jharkhand MLAs 2014–2019